Paul Doell is an American labor leader. He was elected national president of American Maritime Officers in 2014 and 2018.

References

Living people
American trade union leaders
Year of birth missing (living people)
Place of birth missing (living people)